is a railway station in Teine-ku, Sapporo, Hokkaidō, Japan, operated by Hokkaido Railway Company (JR Hokkaido).The station is numbered S09.

Lines
Hoshioki Station is served by the Hakodate Main Line.

Station layout
The station consists of two ground-level opposed side platforms serving two tracks, with the station situated above the tracks. The station has automated ticket machines, automated turnstiles which accept Kitaca, and a "Midori no Madoguchi" staffed ticket office.

Platforms

Adjacent stations

Layout
Japan National Route 5 (to Hakodate)
Emori Memorial Hoshioki Ice Skating Rink
Otome Waterfall
Hoshioki Waterfall
Joy Supermarket
Ronald McDonald House Charities, Sapporo
Hokkaido Teine Nursing School
Pastoral Hoshioki Shopping Mall
Fashion Mall Hoshioki
Hokuyu Lucky Supermarket
CO-OP Sapporo, Hoshioki branch
Teine Hoshioki Police Station
Teine Hoshioki Station Post Office
North Pacific Bank, Shin-Hoshioki branch
Hokkaido Bank, Hoshioki branch

References

External links
 Hoshioki JR Hokkaido map

Railway stations in Japan opened in 1985
Teine-ku, Sapporo
Railway stations in Sapporo